Krodham 2 is a 2000 Indian Tamil language thriller film, produced, written and directed by Prem Menon. The film stars Prem Menon himself, alongside Radhika Chaudhari and Khushbu, while Nassar and Mansoor Ali Khan portray supporting roles. A sequel to A. Jagannathan's 1982 film, Krodham, the music for the film was composed by Deva and the film was released on 1 September 2000.

Plot

Cast 
 Prem Menon as Dheeran
 Radhika Chaudhari
 Khushbu as Latha
 Rajeev as Rajasekharan
 Nassar as Rathnavel
 Mansoor Ali Khan as Selvakumar
 Anandaraj as Yogaraj
 Senthil

Production 
A sequel to his earlier film Krodham (1982), Prem Menon began work on the project during 1999 after returning from an alternate career in business in London. The film was shot in Salem, Chennai and Kerala. Prem was inspired to make a rare sequel in Tamil cinema after being inspired by Hollywood actions films. Radhika Chaudhari was cast in the film after Prem failed to bring a Dubai-based actress into the project.

Soundtrack 
Soundtrack was composed by Deva and lyrics written by Piraisoodan.

Reception 
Malathi Rangarajan of The Hindu wrote the film "begins with engrossing and sophisticated action from the word `go' which continues till the end of the first half, but action tapers into melodrama and tedium, especially in the last few scenes". Malini Mannath wrote in Chennai Online, "The first half of the film keeps one engaged with its racy narration and clever use of gadgetry and computer graphics. But the second half is a long drawn out affair". The film did not perform well at the box office.

References

External links 
 

2000 action thriller films
2000 films
2000s Tamil-language films
Films scored by Deva (composer)
Indian action thriller films
Indian sequel films